A semantic layer is a business representation of corporate data that helps end users access data autonomously using common business terms managed through Business semantics management. A semantic layer maps complex data into familiar business terms such as product, customer, or revenue to offer a unified, consolidated view of data across the organization.

By using common business terms, rather than data language, to access, manipulate, and organize information, a semantic layer simplifies the complexity of business data. Business terms are stored as objects in a semantic layer, which are accessed through business views.

The semantic layer enables business users to have a common "look and feel" when accessing and analyzing data stored in relational databases and OLAP cubes. This is claimed to be core business intelligence (BI) technology that frees users from IT while ensuring correct results.

Business Views is a multi-tier system that is designed to enable companies to build comprehensive and specific business objects that help report designers and end users access the information they require. Business Views is intended to enable people to add the necessary business context to their data islands and link them into a single organized Business View for their organization.

Semantic layer maps tables to classes and rows to objects.

References

Business intelligence